Elsagate is a neologism referring to the controversy surrounding videos on YouTube and YouTube Kids that are categorized as "child-friendly", but which contain themes that are very inappropriate for young children. Most videos under this classification are notable for presenting inappropriate content; those include graphic violence, sexual situations, fetishes, obscene language, drugs, alcohol, nudity, injections, disease, off-color humor,  dangerous or upsetting situations and activities.

These videos often feature fictional characters from family-oriented media, sometimes via crossovers, used without legal permission. However, the Elsagate controversy has also included channels—those include Toy Freaks, which featured or focuses on real children instead of fictional characters, raising concern about possible child abuse.

Most videos in this category are produced either with live action or inexpensive Flash animation, although a few channels use more elaborate techniques such as claymation or computer-generated imagery. Despite YouTube's age restriction policies, these videos are sometimes tagged in such a way as to circumvent the inbuilt child safety algorithms, even ascended onto YouTube Kids, and are thus difficult to moderate due to the large scale of the platform. In order to capture search results and attract attention from users, their titles and descriptions feature the names of the fictional characters, as well as keywords like "education", "learn colors", "nursery rhymes", etc. They also include automatically placed commercials, making them lucrative to their owners and YouTube. Despite the objectionable and often confusing nature of these videos, it has been considered for receiving positive receptions or attracting millions of views. 

Public awareness of the phenomenon grew in late 2017, as mainstream media started to report about child safety on YouTube. That year—after reports by several media outlets—YouTube adopted stricter guidelines regarding children's content. In late November, the company started to mass-delete channels and videos falling into the Elsagate category, as well as large amounts of other inappropriate videos or user comments relating to children.

History

Early history (2016–2017)
In June 2016, The Guardian published an article about the channel Webs and Tiaras, which had been created in March of the same year. The channel showed people dressed as characters like Spider-Man, Elsa, and the Joker engaging in bizarre or nonsensical actions. The videos themselves had background music but no dialogue. Having no script, there was no language barrier on the videos which would normally hinder worldwide distribution. The article also reported that several nearly identical channels named Toy Monster, The Superheroes Life, and The Kids Club had appeared on YouTube.

In January 2017, one channel under the control of a YouTube partner in Vietnam, Spiderman Frozen Marvel Superhero Real Life, blocked their Vietnamese subscribers after complaints from parents regarding the content of their videos. The channel's owner was later fined by Vietnamese authorities.

Increasing the number of views had led some to voice concerns that such channels are gaming the system by using bots or click farms to inflate viewing figures to higher proportions; however, there is no evidence for this.

In February 2017, The Verge commented that "adults dressing up in costume and acting out weird, wordless skits has become a booming industry on the world's biggest video platform" and that while many videos were "puerile but benign", others featured more questionable content such as scatological humor and violent or sexual situations. The article noted that most videos were made with a very limited budget and "a few Halloween costumes", which made them easy to produce and contributed to their multiplication. It also attributed their success to the frequent use of "Freudian concerns", which young children may find fascinating, amusing, or frightening, such as "peeing, pooping, kissing, pregnancy, and the terrifying notion of going to the doctor and getting a shot".

Also in February, The Awl published an article on Webs and Tiaras and similar channels, describing their content as "nonsensically nightmarish" with titles—those include "Frozen Elsa gets CHICKEN FEET!", "Frozen Elsa gets BRAIN BELLY!", "Frozen Elsa & Anna TEAR SPIDERMAN APART!", "EVIL SANTA KIDNAPS Frozen Elsa & Spiderman!", or "Frozen Elsa FLUSHES Spiderman in Toilet!". The website commented that the videos were "pretty twisted for children's content: some videos involve Elsa giving birth, and in some others, Spider-Man injects Elsa with a brightly colored liquid. You half expect the scenarios to be porn setups." In most videos, the like and dislike options were disabled, which makes it incomprehensible to understand how many users were actually engaging with them. Many videos feature hundreds of comments—positively received in both foreign or verbiage—in which some are written by similar channels in an apparent attempt to attract more clicks.

In March, the BBC ran a piece titled "The disturbing YouTube videos that are tricking children". The article focuses on a Peppa Pig imitation, where the titular character's teeth are painfully pulled out by a dentist, and a video featuring said character burning down an occupied house. The article also mentioned the existence of "hundreds" of similar videos, ranging from unauthorized but otherwise harmless copies of authentic animations to frightening and gory content.

CTV News also reported in March about YouTube's "fake toons problem", with adult-themed imitations of popular children's shows frequently appearing on YouTube Kids: "In some cases, the video will feature a kid-friendly thumbnail, while the video itself might be entirely different" and be very unsuitable for small children. The network commented that such videos were "often nightmares to behold, with lots of frightening scenes involving monsters and blood. Many of these videos venture into dark territory, with the characters often being chased, attacked, or injured in a bloody manner."

The term "Elsagate" was coined on the Internet in 2017. During the summer of that year, it became a popular hashtag on Twitter as users called attention to the presence of such material on YouTube and YouTube Kids. On Reddit, an Elsagate subreddit (r/ElsaGate) was created on June 23 to discuss the phenomenon, soon attracting tens of thousands of users.

Discovery of Elsagate videos (2017)
In November 2017, several newspapers published articles about the YouTube channel Toy Freaks, which had been created two years earlier by a single father named Greg Chism. Toy Freaks had a total of 8.54 million subscribers and were among the top 100 most viewed before it shut down that month. The channel often featured Chism's daughters and in most cases showed them scared or crying.

These videos could also be found in local video platforms in China, where YouTube is blocked, including Tencent, Youku, and iQiyi. Tencent have set up a specific team to monitor its video platform and permanently shut down 121 accounts and blocked more than 4,000 search keywords by January 2018. The Ministry of Public Security of China suggested that netizens should report these videos once found.

Several celebrities, including rapper B.o.B and comedians Joe Rogan and Philip DeFranco discussed Elsagate on social media during this time.

On November 4, The New York Times published an article about the "startling" videos slipping past YouTube's filters and disturbing children, "either by mistake or because bad actors have found ways to fool the YouTube Kids algorithms". On November 6, author James Bridle published an essay titled Something is wrong on the internet on Medium, in which he commented about the "thousands and thousands of these videos": "Someone or something or some combination of people and things is using YouTube to systematically frighten, traumatize, and abuse children, automatically and at scale". Bridle also observed that the confusing content of many videos seemed to result from the constant "overlaying and intermixing" of various popular tropes, characters, or keywords. As a result, even videos with actual humans started resembling automated content, while "obvious parodies and even the shadier knock-offs" interacted with "the legions of algorithmic content producers" until it became "completely impossible to know what is going on". On November 17, Internet commentator Philip DeFranco posted a video addressing "the insane YouTube Kids problem".

The New York Times found that one of the channels featuring counterfeit cartoons, Super Zeus TV, was linked to a website called SuperKidsShop.com, registered in Ho Chi Minh City, Vietnam. A man working for SuperKidsShop.com confirmed that his partners were responsible for the videos, on which "a team of about 100 people" were producing. Subsequent requests for an interview went unanswered.

On November 9, members of the satirical sound collage group Negativland presented an episode of their weekly radio show Over the Edge dedicated to Elsagate. "'Modern Animal Kids' threads Elsagate through a remix of three 90's episodes of Over the Edge which focused on media for children, all broadcast in the final years before Teletubbies pioneered marketing to the 6- to 18-month-old demographic".

On November 22, BuzzFeed News published an article about unsettling videos that depict children in disturbing and abusive situations. The information on the article came with the assistance of journalist and human rights activist Matan Uziel, whose investigation and report to the FBI on that matter were sent on September 22, informing its leadership about "tens of thousands of videos available on YouTube that we know are crafted to serve as eye candy for perverted, creepy adults, online predators to indulge in their child fantasies".

On November 23, French-Canadian outlet Tabloïd released a video investigation about Toy Monster, a channel linked to Webs and Tiaras. They confronted the videos' creators – based out of the south shore of Quebec City – who refused to be interviewed. One of the actors featured in the videos anonymously stated that he was contractually obligated to refrain from commenting. The investigation revealed that identical content was being posted on numerous channels apparently operated by the same people.

On November 28, Forbes presented Elsagate as an example of the "dark underbelly of the digital age". The article's author commented that the "gargantuan scale" of the problem seemed to indicate that children's content on YouTube had become "a monster beyond our control" and that "it's terrifying to imagine how many toddlers have been affected" by Elsagate, "in ways beyond our comprehension".

Effect on children
Several parents, teenagers, and peers posting on the r/ElsaGate subreddit expressed fears that the videos were traumatizing to children, and may desensitize or normalize inappropriate content.

The New York Times quoted pediatrics professor Michael Rich, who stated that these videos were potentially harmful to children who could find them even more upsetting, as "characters they thought they knew and trusted" were shown behaving in an improper or violent manner.

Response from YouTube
In August 2017, YouTube announced its new guidelines on content and monetization. In an ongoing series of efforts to demonetize controversial and offensive videos, it was announced that creators would no longer be able to monetize videos that "made inappropriate use of family-friendly characters". In November of the same year, it announced that it would implement "a new policy that age restricts this content in the YouTube main app when flagged".

The controversy extended to channels that featured not necessarily children's characters but actual children, who sometimes performed inappropriate or dangerous activities under the guidance of adults. As part of a broader action, YouTube terminated the channel Toy Freaks, which featured a father (Greg Chism) and his two daughters in potentially abusive situations. Chism was subsequently investigated by child-protection officials in Illinois and Missouri for alleged child abuse. In December 2017, authorities announced that Chism would not face criminal charges. Before its removal, the channel had over 8.5 million subscribers.

It was also revealed in the media that many videos featuring minors – frequently uploaded by the children themselves and showing innocent content – had attracted comments from pedophiles and other groups. Some of these videos were monetized. As a result of the controversy, several major advertisers froze spending on YouTube, forcing YouTube to ban children from their site, citing legal obligations.

On November 22, 2017, YouTube announced that it had deleted over 50 channels and thousands of videos that did not fit the new guidelines. On November 27, the company said in a statement to BuzzFeed News that it had "terminated more than 270 accounts and removed over 150,000 videos", "turned off comments on more than 625,000 videos targeted by child predators" and "removed ads from nearly 2 million videos and over 50,000 channels masquerading as family-friendly content". Forbes contributor Dani Di Placido wrote that many problematic videos could still be seen on the platform, and that "the sheer volume of videos hastily deleted from the site prove that YouTube's algorithms were utterly ineffective at protecting young children".

See also
 Shock site, a similar method
 Toy Freaks, a controversial YouTube channel run by Gregory Chism
 FamilyOFive, a YouTube channel which was at the centre of a scandal in 2017 over child abuse featured in its videos
 Fantastic Adventures scandal, a 2019 YouTube scandal involving the owner of a channel inflicting intentional child abuse on her children featured in the videos
 Momo Challenge hoax, an alleged internet challenge in 2019 which became the subject of a moral panic
 Internet screamers, controversial pranks using jumpscares and loud noises
 
 Child Online Protection Act (COPA) and Children's Online Privacy Protection Act (COPPA)
 Rule 34
 Rule 63
 Not safe for work (NSFW)
 Not safe for life (NSFL)
 Cartoon pornography
 Balenciaga child advertising controversy

References

External links
 

2007 establishments in South Korea
Internet memes introduced in 2007
'

2007 YouTube videos
2017 controversies
2017 scandals
Abortion in fiction
Child abuse
Child abuse in fiction
Child welfare
Copyright infringement
Criticism of Google
Fiction about death
Entertainment scandals
Fiction about murder
Internet culture
Internet memes introduced in 2017
Kidnapping in fiction
Mass psychogenic illness
Obscenity controversies in animation
Online obscenity controversies
2017 neologisms
YouTube controversies
Internet memes
Internet memes introduced in the 2010s
2010s neologisms
2007 neologisms